The All-Ireland Senior Hurling Championship of 1968 was the 82nd staging of Ireland's premier hurling knock-out competition.  Wexford won the championship, beating Tipperary 5-8 to 3-12  in the final at Croke Park, Dublin.

The championship

Participating counties

Format

Leinster Championship
First round: (1 match) This is a single match between two of the weaker teams drawn from the province of Leinster.  One team is eliminated at this stage, while the winners advance to the quarter-final.

Second round: (1 match) This is a single match between the winner of the first round and another team drawn from the province of Leinster.  One team is eliminated at this stage, while the winners advance to the semi-finals.

Semi-finals: (2 matches) The winners of the quarter-final join three other Leinster teams to make up the semi-final pairings.  Two teams are eliminated at this stage, while two teams advance to the Leinster final.

Final: (1 match) The winners of the two semi-finals contest this game.  One team is eliminated at this stage, while the winners advance to the All-Ireland final.

Munster Championship

First round: (2 matches) These are two lone matches between the first four teams drawn from the province of Munster.  Two teams are eliminated at this stage, while two teams advance to the semi-finals.

Semi-finals: (2 matches) The winners of the two quarter-finals join the other two Munster teams to make up the semi-final pairings.  Two teams are eliminated at this stage, while two teams advance to the final.

Final: (1 match) The winners of the two semi-finals contest this game.  One team is eliminated at this stage, while the winners advance to the All-Ireland final.

All-Ireland Championship

Final: (1 match) The Leinster and the Munster champions contest the All-Ireland final.

Fixtures

Leinster Senior Hurling Championship

Munster Senior Hurling Championship

All-Ireland Senior Hurling Championship

Top scorers

Season

Single game

References

 Corry, Eoghan, The GAA Book of Lists (Hodder Headline Ireland, 2005).
 Donegan, Des, The Complete Handbook of Gaelic Games (DBA Publications Limited, 2005).
 Sweeney, Éamonn, Munster Hurling Legends (The O'Brien Press, 2002).

See also

1968
All-Ireland Senior Hurling Championship